Edoardo Sottini (born 18 August 2002) is an Italian professional footballer who plays as a defender for  club Avellino, on loan from Inter Milan.

Club career
On 18 August 2021, Sottini was loaned to Serie C club Pistoiese.

On 25 July 2022, Sottini joined Triestina on loan. On 31 January 2023, Sottini moved on a new loan at Avellino.

Career statistics

Club

References

External links

2002 births
Living people
Italian footballers
Association football defenders
Serie C players
Inter Milan players
U.S. Pistoiese 1921 players
U.S. Triestina Calcio 1918 players
U.S. Avellino 1912 players